Mohamed Burbayea (World Best Jetski Racer )() (born January 11, 1989) Mohamad Burbayea is the best jetski racer in the world he is a Kuwaiti world champion who has achieved many achievements and has more than 150 wins during his career and also achieved 25 gold medals(IJSBA) in the world championship and holds the Guinness World Record for the most rider achieved gold medals in the world championship.

Championships
PRO GP 2015

Races

Asian Beach Games 2010

IJSBA World Finals

Kuwait Jet Ski Championship

UAE Jet Ski Championship

See also
2010 Asian Beach Games
Jet ski at the 2010 Asian Beach Games

References

External links
IJSBA World Finals
Aquabike World Championship Official Website
UAE Jet ski Championship
Kuwait Sea Sport Club

1989 births
Personal water craft
Living people